Ulyana Viktorovna Sergeenko (born 30 August 1979) is a Kazakh and Russian fashion designer.

Early life
Sergeenko was born into a family of linguists in Ust-Kamenogorsk, Kazakhstan, when it was still part of the USSR.

She studied in a specialized humanitarian school in Kazakhstan and then graduated the Faculty of Philology at the St. Petersburg State University.

Being always interested in fashion, Sergeenko put her interest to a next level when she decided to collect it, since then building an eclectic collection of antique and vintage clothes and accessories ranging from the rare ancient jewelry to Soviet school uniform. Hunting for the new rarities she frequently visits flea-markets and vintage boutiques as well as bids on a major fashion auctions.

Career

First Steps
Sergeenko became a client of Valentino, Givenchy, Jean Paul Gaultier, Chanel, and Dior. Noted for her style, she was dubbed part of the Russian Mafia by fashion bloggers alongside fellow Russians Miroslava Duma, Elena Perminova and Vika Gazinskaya. However Sergeenko grew frustrated when pieces she had collaborated with designers on showed up in their collections with no credit given to her contributions.  As a result, Sergeenko launched her eponymous fashion label in 2011 in Russia.

Own Label
The Ulyana Sergeenko brand was launched in Moscow in April 2011 with a first collection designed for autumn-winter 2011–2012. After the first two collections shown in Moscow, the brand has received much media attention as well as buyer's and client's requests from all over the world. By now, the Moscow-based company produces ready-to-wear women's clothes, bags, fine jewellery and headpieces. Besides the retail stock, the Ulyana Sergeenko brand also has an atelier where clients could order made-to-measure versions of the runway items.

Sergeenko's first couture collection was warmly received with reviewers noting that her style was a blend of Russian military, literary and fairytale influences. Her debut collection featured clingy knit tops, quilted skirts, floor-sweeping greatcoats, and enough sable to swaddle the Russian army.

One of the key principles of Sergeenko's work is meticulous attention to details and quality. Much hand-craft - stitching, knitting, embroidery etc. - goes into production of every item. Everything is produced in Moscow under the strict control of the designer herself. All fabrics and trimmings are bought in France, Italy or Japan and some garments have vintage details specifically picked at antique markets. Craftsmanship and technical knowledge have defined her work from the beginning. Sergeenko collaborates with highly skilled ateliers from Russia as well as numerous craftsmen from former Soviet republics, helping them to preserve their precious knowledge in the process. Within the last five years, Sergeenko has worked with around seventy different ateliers and craftsmen including lace makers from Yelets, Vologda and Krestsy.
She recently conducted an interview for the fashion magazine Vanity Teen, accentuating her identity with the culture of her country when designing each of their products.

Clients
Beyoncé appeared in one of her creations in her music video for Haunted. Singer Lady Gaga, burlesque performer Dita von Teese, socialite Kim Kardashian and model Natalia Vodianova are also clients.

Personal life
Sergeenko is divorced from Russian insurance billionaire Danil Khachaturov, general director and co-owner of Rosgosstrakh. She has 2 children: son Alexander (from a previous relationship) and daughter Vasilisa (with Khachaturov).

Controversy 
In 2018, Sergeenko's handwritten note to Miroslava Duma, which said "to my N***as in Paris", caused uproar in the fashion industry because of its content. She apologized, and said that she did not mean to cause offense.

References

1979 births
Living people
People from Oskemen
Russian fashion designers
Russian women fashion designers
Saint Petersburg State University alumni